Blowing snow is snow lifted from the surface by the wind, at eye level or more, that will reduce visibility. Blowing snow can come from falling snow or snow that already accumulated on the ground but is picked up and blown about by strong winds. It is one of the classic requirements for a blizzard. Its METAR code is BLSN. If the snow remains below , it will be called drifting snow (METAR code DRSN). The snow which is being blown about may deposit as snowdrifts.

Formation

There are 3 ways of producing blowing snow:
 In horizontal advection conditions, the winds blow across the surface of the earth with very little if any large-scale upward motion.
 In thermal-mechanical mixing conditions, massive convective rolls form in the atmosphere and the blizzard may be observed from space with the blizzards convective rolls creating waves of snow (also known as snow billows) resembling lake or ocean effect snow bands. The extreme conditions can quickly bury a two-story home and make breathing very difficult if not impossible if caught outdoors.

See also

 Blizzard
 Blowing Snow Advisory
 Ground blizzard
 Severe weather terminology (Canada)
 Snowsquall
 Whiteout (weather)

Notes

Snow or ice weather phenomena
Fog